David Sater (born November 7, 1947) is a former Republican member of the Missouri Senate, representing the 29th district. Previously, Sater served 4 terms in the Missouri House of Representatives (2004-2012), representing the 68th District.

Early life and education 
Born November 7, 1947 in Springfield, Missouri, Sater graduated from Greenwood High School in Springfield in 1965,and received a Bachelor of Science degree in Biology and Chemistry from Southwest Missouri State University in 1969. He went on to earn a degree in Pharmacy from the University of Missouri-Kansas City in 1972.

Professional life 
After earning his Pharm.D., Sater owned and operated Sater Pharmacy in Cassville from 1974 to 2004.

Electoral history

State Representative

State Senate

Personal life 
Sater and his wife, Sharon, reside in Cassville, Missouri and have two children, Joshua and Samantha. Sater is a member of the First Baptist Church of Cassville.

References

http://www.senate.mo.gov/14info/members/mem29.htm 
https://web.archive.org/web/20140826192637/http://davidsater.org/about.php

Living people
Republican Party Missouri state senators
Republican Party members of the Missouri House of Representatives
University of Missouri–Kansas City alumni
Missouri State University alumni
American pharmacists
1947 births
21st-century American politicians
Politicians from Springfield, Missouri
People from Cassville, Missouri